Mount Krüger, or Krügerfjellet, is a  mountain standing  southwest of Kvithø Peak in the Sverdrup Mountains of Queen Maud Land, Antarctica. The summit of Krüger is the highest point in the Sverdrup Mtns.

Discovery and naming
Mount Krüger was discovered by the Third German Antarctic Expedition (1938–1939), led by Captain Alfred Ritscher, and named for Walter Krüger, a meteorological assistant on the expedition. It was surveyed by the Norwegian–British–Swedish Antarctic Expedition (1949–1952), led by John Schjelderup Giæver.

See also
 List of mountains of Queen Maud Land

References

External links
 Scientific Committee on Antarctic Research (SCAR)

Mountains of Queen Maud Land
Princess Martha Coast